The nuraghe (plural: Logudorese Sardinian , Campidanese Sardinian  , Italian ), or also nurhag in English, is the main type of ancient megalithic edifice found in Sardinia, developed during the Nuragic Age between 1900 and 730 B.C. Today it has come to be the symbol of Sardinia and its distinctive culture known as the Nuragic civilization. More than 7,000 nuraghes have been found, though archeologists believe that originally there were more than 10,000.

Etymology

According to the Oxford English Dictionary the etymology is "uncertain and disputed": "The word is perhaps related to the Sardinian place names Nurra, Nurri, Nurru, and to Sardinian nurra 'heap of stones, cavity in earth' (although these senses are difficult to reconcile). A connection with the Semitic base of Arabic nūr 'light, fire, etc.' is now generally rejected." The Latin word murus ('wall') may be related to it, being a result of the derivation: murus–*muraghe–nuraghe. However, such theory is debated.

An etymological theory suggests a Proto-Basque origin by the term *nur (stone) with the common -ak plural ending; the Paleo-Sardinian suffix -ake, also found in some Indo-European languages such as Latin and Greek. Another possible explanation is that the term nuraghe came from the name of the Iberian mythological hero Norax, and the root *nur would be an adaptation of the Indo-European root *nor.

General layout
The typical nuraghe is situated in areas where previous prehistoric Sardinian cultures had been distributed, that is not far from alluvial plains (though few nuraghes appear in plains currently as they were destroyed by human activities such as agriculture, dams, road building etc.) and has the outer shape of a truncated conical tower, thus resembling a medieval tower, with a tholos-like vault inside.

The structure's walls consist of three components: an outer layer (tilted inwards and made of many layers of stones whose size diminishes with increasing height: mostly, lower layers consist of rubble masonry, while upper layers tend to be of ashlar masonry); an inner layer, made of smaller stones (to form a corbelled dome of the bullet-shaped tholos type, and where ashlar masonry is used more frequently); and an intermediate layer of very small pieces and dirt, which makes the whole construction very sturdy: it stands only by virtue of the weight of its stones, which may each amount to several tons. Some nuraghes are about 20 meters (60 ft) in height, the tallest one known, Nuraghe Arrubiu, reached a height of 25–30 meters.

The entrance leads into a corridor, on whose sides are often open niches, that lead to the round chamber. A spiral stone stair, leading to upper floors (if present) and/or to a terrace, was built within the thick walls and it was illuminated by embrasures. The Nuragic towers might have as much as three corbel chambers one on top of the other. In complex Nuraghes corridors were often present, sometimes corbelled, such as at Santu Antine, in which the corbelled arch corridors were superimposed on two levels, and reached a length of 27 meters.

Today fewer than 7,000 nuraghes remain standing; their number was originally larger. Nuraghes are most prevalent in the northwest and south-central parts of the island.

Function

There is no consensus on the function of the nuraghes: they could have been rulers' residences, military strongholds, meeting halls, religious temples, ordinary dwellings or a combination of any of these things. Some of the nuraghes are, however, located in strategic places – such as hills – from which important passages could be easily controlled. They might have been something between a "status symbol" and a "passive defence" building, meant to be a deterrent for possible enemies.

Nuraghes could also have been the "national" symbol of the Nuragic peoples. Small-scale models of nuraghe have often been excavated at religious sites (e.g. in the "maze" temple at the Su Romanzesu site near Bitti in central Sardinia). Nuraghes may have just connoted wealth or power, or they may have been an indication that a site had its owners. Recent unconfirmed theories tend to suggest that Sardinian towns were independent entities (such as the city-states, although in a geographical sense they were not cities) that formed federations and that the building of these monuments might have depended on agreed-on distributions of territory among federated unities.

In 2002, Juan Belmonte and Mauro Zedda measured the entrance orientations (declinations and azimuths) of 272 simple nuraghes and of the central towers of 180 complex ones. The data revealed clear peaks corresponding to orientations pointing to the sunrise at winter solstice and to the Moon at its southernmost rising position. These alignments remained constant throughout the history of nuraghe. The most common declinations revealed were of around −43° for the earlier nuraghes, shifting to just −45½° for the later. Zedda has suggested that the target is likely a star, quite possibly Alpha Centauri.

Types

Protonuraghe
Protonuraghe are considered to be the most archaic type; they differ somewhat from the "classical" (tholos vaulted) Nuraghes in their stockier look. Protonuraghes generally follow an irregular plan and lack the large circular room present in presumed later forms; instead, they are laid out along one or more corridors or long rooms. Although lacking the central circular room, they are sometimes similar sizes as later nuraghe.

Mixed nuraghe
This type is distinguished by the restorations made in later times, supposedly due to a change of the Protonuraghes design, or for other needs.

Single tower nuraghe
This is considered to be the predominant type of Nuraghe, and it represents the most diffused typology. The single tower, of a truncated conical shape, accommodates within itself one or more superimposed chambers, covered by a tholos-shaped chamber. The access, generally located at the ground level, leads into a passageway that leads, in the front, into the central chamber and in one side (usually the left) in the helical staircase, built inside the wall mass, that lead to the terrace or to the upper-floor chamber.

In addition to the usual circular rooms, in their inside can be found other smaller environments such as niches.

A "tancadu" nuraghe
A "tancadu" Nuraghe (Sardinian term for courtyard) represents the evolution of the single tower Nuraghe; another circular building was later added to the main tower, with two enclosing curtain walls connecting the two. A courtyard was present within the structure, sometimes provided with a well.

Polylobed nuraghe
Also called Nuragic royal palaces, the polylobed Nuraghes are the least frequent typology. Very elaborate and often designed in a unified manner, they look like veritable fortresses with several towers linked by high ramparts, whose function was to offer more useful space and perhaps to reinforce the central tower. These "Megalithic castles" were surrounded by additional walls, sometimes also provided with towers (the so-called bulwark).

Notable nuraghes
Nuraghes are inscribed on the UNESCO World Heritage Site list. Su Nuraxi di Barumini, in the south of the island, has been chosen to represent all the nuragic patrimony, but one of the highest and most complex Nuraghes is the Nuraghe Santu Antine near the village of Torralba, in northern Sardinia. Other famous nuraghes are near Alghero (Nuraghe Palmavera), Macomer, Abbasanta (see Losa), Orroli (Nuraghe Arrubiu), Gonnesa (Nuraghe Seruci) and Villanovaforru (Nuraghe Genna Maria).

Date and cultural significance
The nuraghes were built between the middle of the Bronze Age (18th-15th centuries BCE) and the Late Bronze Age. The claim that the El-Ahwat structures from Israel might be related has been contested; those are dated to either the 12th or the 11th century BCE. The only buildings widely accepted as being related to nuraghes are the torri (plural of torre) from southern Corsica and the talaiots from Menorca and Majorca.

According to Massimo Pallottino, an Italian archaeologist specialized in Etruscology, the architecture produced by the Nuragic civilization was the most advanced of any in the western Mediterranean during this epoch, including those in the regions of Magna Graecia. Of the 7,000 extant nuraghes, only a few have been scientifically excavated.

Image gallery

See also
Ahwat
Beehive tomb
Broch
Chullpa
Giants' grave
Girna
Motillas 
Talaiot

Notes

Bibliography

 Giovanni Lilliu, I nuraghi. Torri preistoriche della Sardegna, Nuoro, Edizioni Ilisso, 2005. 
 
 Paolo Melis, Civiltà Nuragica, Sassari, Delfino editore, 2003. 
 Giovanni Ugas, L'alba dei Nuraghi, Cagliari, Fabula, 2005.

External links

Aerial photograph of Su Nuraxi
Nuraghi.org Su Nuraxi of Barumini
A map of all Nuraghes in Sardinia 
Another map providing the location of each Nuraghe - Nurnet
ArcheologiaSarda.com  
NeroArgento.com  
Virtual Reconstructions  
Virtual Tour in HD 

 
Archaeology of Sardinia
Types of monuments and memorials
Buildings and structures in Sardinia
Megalithic monuments in Italy